Lew is the usual shortened form of Lewis or Llywelyn when they are used as first names in English.

It can also be found in Slavic languages as a translation of Latin name Leon, where it may be written as "Lew" or "Lev".

People with the name

Arts
 Lew Anderson (1922–2006), American actor and musician
 Lew Ayres (1908–1996), American actor
 Lew Bedell (1919–2000), American music executive and entertainer
 Lew Brown (1893–1958), Russian-American lyricist
 Lew Buford Brown (1861–1944), American editor and poet
 Lew Christensen (1909–1984), American ballet dancer, choreographer, and director
 Lew Cody (1884–1934), American actor
 Lew Davis (1884–1948), American film actor
 Lew DeWitt (1938–1990), American country music singer and composer
 Lew Dietz (1907–1997), American writer
 Lew Dockstader (1856–1924), American singer and comedian
 Lew Douglas (1912–1997), American composer, arranger, and conductor
 Lew Fields (1867–1941), American actor and producer
 Lew Futterman, American record producer
 Lew Gallo (1928–2000), American actor and producer
 Lew Grade (1906–1998), Ukrainian-born English impresario and media mogul
 Lew Harvey (1887–1953), American actor
 Lew Hunter (born 1935), American screenwriter, author, and educator
 Lew Kelly (1879–1944), American actor
 Lew Jetton (born 1959), American musician and meteorologist
 Lew Johnson (fl. 1866–1890), American minstrel-troupe owner
 Lew Landers (1901–1962), American film and television director
 Lew Lehr (1895–1950), American comedian, writer, and editor
 Lew Leslie (1888–1963), American theater writer and producer
 Lew Lewis, English harmonica player and vocalist
 Lew Meehan (1890–1951), American actor
 Lew McCreary (born 1947), American author, editor, and speaker
 Lew Nottke, American guitarist
 Lew Parker (1910–1972), American actor
 Lew Pollack (1895–1946), American songwriter
 Lew Porter (1892–1956), American composer and songwriter
 Lew Rywin (born 1945), Russian-born Polish film producer
 Lew Schneider (born 1961), American television producer, writer, actor, and comedian
 Lew Schwartz (1926–2011), American comic book artist
 Lew Soloff (born 1944), American jazz musician and actor
 Lew Spence (1920–2008), American songwriter
 Lew Stone (1898-1969), English jazz bandleader
 Lew Stringer (born 1959), English comic artist and scriptwriter
 Lew Tabackin (born 1940), American jazz musician
 Lew Temple (born 1967), American actor
 Lew Wallace (1827–1905), American author, lawyer, general, and politician
 Lew Wasserman (1913–2002), American talent agent and studio executive
 Lew Welch (1926–1971), American Beat poet
 Lew Williams (born 1934), American rockabilly singer and songwriter

Politics
 Lew Frederick (born 1951), American politician
 Lew Johnstone (1916–1983), Australian politician
 Lew Rockwell (born 1944), American libertarian political commentator
 Lew Sapieha (1557–1633), leader of the Grand Duchy of Lithuania

Sports
 Lew Alcindor (born 1947), American retired basketball player who adopted the Muslim name Kareem Abdul-Jabbar
 Lew Andreas (1895–1983), American basketball and football coach
 Lew Barnes (born 1962), American football player
 Lew Beck (basketball) (1922–1970), American basketball player
 Lew Beasley (born 1948), American baseball player
 Lew Bradford (1916–1984), English footballer
 Lew Booth (1912–1984), Welsh footballer
 Lew Brown (baseball) (1858–1889), American baseball player
 Lew Burdette (1926–2007), American baseball player
 Lew Camp (1868–1948), American baseball player
 Lew Carpenter (1932–2010), American football player and coach
 Lew Carpenter (baseball) (1913–1979), American baseball player
 Lew Carr (1872–1954), American baseball player
 Lew Chatterley (born 1945), English footballer and coach
 Lew Dodak (born 1946), American politician
 Lew Drill (1877–1969), American baseball player
 Lew Evans (fl. 1881–1904), Australian rugby union player
 Lew Flick (1915–1990), American baseball player
 Lew Fonseca (1899–1989), American baseball player
 Lew Ford (born 1976), American baseball player
 Lew Gerrard (born 1938), New Zealand tennis player
 Lew Graulich (1862–1934), American baseball player
 Lew Groh, (1883–1960), American baseball player
 Lew Hayman (1908–1984), American-born Canadian football coach and executive
 Lew Hitch (1929–2012), American basketball player
 Lew Hoad (1934–1994), Australian tennis player
 Lew Jenkins (1916–1981), American boxer
 Lew Krausse Sr. (1912–1988), American baseball player and scout
 Lew Krausse Jr. (born 1943), American baseball player
 Lew Lane (1899–1980), American football coach
 Lew Luce (born 1938), American football player
 Lew Malone (1897–1972), American baseball player
 Lew Massey (born 1956), American basketball player
 Lew Mayne (born 1920), American football player
 Lew McCarty (1888–1930), American baseball player
 Lew Meehl (born 1946), American soccer player
 Lew Moren (1883–1966), American baseball player
 Lew Morgan, (1911–1988), Scottish footballer
 Lew Morrison (born 1948), Canadian ice hockey player
 Lew Perkins (born 1945), American athletic director
 Lew Phelan (1864–1933), American baseball manager
 Lew Post (1875–1944), American baseball player
 Lew Richie (1883–1936), American baseball player
 Lew Riggs (1910–1975), American baseball player
 Lew Ritter (1875–1952), American baseball player
 Lew Sharpe (1906–2001), Australian rules footballer
 Lew Shaver, American football and wheelchair basketball coach
 Lew Simmons (1838–1911), American baseball manager
 Lew Skinner (1898–1941), American football player
 Lew Tendler (1898–1970), American boxer
 Lew Watts (1922–2003), American baseball player and coach
 Lew Wendell (1892–1953), American baseball player and manager
 Lew Whistler (1868–1959), American baseball player
 Lew Woodroffe (born 1921), English footballer
 Lew Worsham (1917–1990), American golfer
 Lew Wyld (1905–1974), British track cyclist
 Lew Yates (born 1947), English boxer
 Lew Zivanovic (born 1959), Australian rugby league player

Other
 Lew Adams (born 1940), British trade unionist
 Lew Allen (1925–2010), United States Air Force general
 Lew Baker (fl. 1825–1856), Welsh-born American policeman and accused assassin
 Lew Campbell (1831–1910), Canadian pioneer rancher 
 Lew Cirne (born 1970), Canadian-American technologist and entrepreneur
 Lew Irwin, American journalist
 Lew Kowarski (1907–1979), Russian-born French physicist
 Lew Mander (born 1939), New Zealand organic chemist
 Lew A. Nelson, American test pilot
 Lew Wood (c. 1929–2013), American television journalist

Fictional characters
 Lew Archer, a fictional detective created by Ross Macdonald
 Lew Moxon, a character in the DC Comics Batman series
 Lew Zealand, a Muppet character

See also
 Lew (disambiguation)
 Lev (given name)